The Women's 5000 metres competition at the 2012 Summer Olympics in London, United Kingdom. The event final was held at the Olympic Stadium on 10 of August.

From the start of the final Joanne Pavey took the lead, with Dibaba moving into the fourth position in the procession, ready to cover any moves.  After about four laps Elena Romagnolo took up the front position for a few laps, to be replaced again with Pavey.  At the 3K mark, Julia Bleasdale moved in behind her teammate, but in the next 200 metres, Dibaba decided it was time to take up the lead.  The pace accelerated markedly, with the Ethiopian and Kenyan teams coming to the front and the others falling off the back.  Viola Jelagat Kibiwot was the last to pay attention, sprinting along the outside to catch the group of leaders.  Bleasdale was the last to stay with that group of six, who had achieved separation with 600 to go,  Dibaba and Meseret Defar, led Kibiwot and Vivian Cheruiyot with the pace steadily increasing.  With 200 to go,  Cheruiyot moved into third, Kibiwot losing ground.  Coming off the turn Defar moved onto Dibaba's shoulder, followed by  Cheruiyot.  Coming around the outside, Defar passed Dibaba, with Dibaba unable to change pace.  3 metres behind,  Cheruiyot followed Defar to the line.

Competition format

The Women's 5000m competition consisted of heats (Round 1) and a Final. The fastest competitors from each race in the heats qualified for the Final along with the fastest overall competitors not already qualified that were required to fill the eight spaces in the Final.

Records
, the existing World and Olympic records were as follows.

Schedule

All times are British Summer Time (UTC+1)

Results

Heats

Qual. rule: first 5 of each heat (Q) plus the 5 fastest times (q) qualified.

Heat 1

Heat 2

Notes: Q- Qualified by place
q - Qualified by performance (time)
PB - Personal Best
NR - National Record
SB - Seasonal Best
DQ - DisQualified
DNS - Did Not Start
DNF - Did Not Finish

Final

References

Athletics at the 2012 Summer Olympics
5000 metres at the Olympics
2012 in women's athletics
Women's events at the 2012 Summer Olympics